Gabriel Kingi Njoroge is a former Kenyan Premier League football coach who handled Mathare Youth F.C., Mathare United, Nairobi City Stars,and Thika United and now in the ranks of Nairobi-based Vifaru Football Academy. He is a KNVB-trained coach and holder of UEFA 'B'as well as CAF 'C' License.

Career
Njoroge was born in Kenya.

In 2006, Njoroge handled Kenya U-17 during the 2007 CECAFA U-17 Championship held in Burundi. 

He coached Mathare Youth for a number of years till 2010. He was then appointed Mathare United coach in December 2011 on a two-year deal to replace Salim Ali. He was relieved of his duties after four months and was replaced by Stanley Okumbi in late Mar 2012. He then returned to Mathare Youth Sports Association. as a Technical Director and Youth Development and Talent Coordinator

In mid-2015 he joined Nairobi City Stars but parted ways with the club after less than five months in charge. In 2018 he landed at Thika United for a short stint.

Honours
CECAFA U-17 Championship
 2nd runners-up (Kenya U17): 2006

Mathare United
 KPL U20 Champions: (Aug) 2016  
 KPL U20 Champions: (Dec) 2016

References

External links
 Gabriel Njoroge at Piga Bao League

Living people
1971 births
Football managers in Kenya
Kenyan football managers